Ollie is a given name and nickname. 

Ollie may also refer to:

 Ollie (skateboarding trick), invented by Alan "Ollie" Gelfand
 Ollie, Iowa, a city in the United States
 Ollie, Kentucky, an unincorporated community
 Ollie's Bargain Outlet, a chain of retail stores in the United States

People with the surname
 Arthur Ollie (born 1941), American politician
 Kevin Ollie (born 1972), American basketball player and coach

See also
 Olli (disambiguation)
 Olly (disambiguation)
 Oli (disambiguation)
 Oly (disambiguation)